Klewno  (German Klawsdorf) is a village in the administrative district of Gmina Reszel, within Kętrzyn County, Warmian-Masurian Voivodeship, in northern Poland.

References

Klewno